Diego Espinoza is a former Democratic member of the Arizona House of Representatives, serving since 2015. On September 5, 2022, he resigned from the Arizona House of Representatives, and withdrew from the Arizona Senate election, to pursue a career outside of politics.

Elections
2014 Espinoza and Mark Cardenas were unopposed in the Democratic primary.  Cardenas and Espinoza defeated Sophia Johnson in the general election.
Despite having won the Democratic primary in August 2022, Espinoza unexpectedly resigned his seat September 5, 2022 to pursue a career outside of politics. With no other candidates, potential candidates have until 5:00 p.m. on November 3 to file as write-ins.

References

External links
Legislative website

Living people
Democratic Party members of the Arizona House of Representatives
Hispanic and Latino American state legislators in Arizona
21st-century American politicians
Politicians from Phoenix, Arizona
Year of birth missing (living people)